Camden National Bank is a bank headquartered in Camden, Maine, with 61 branches, all of which are in Maine. It is a subsidiary of Camden National Corporation, a bank holding company. It is the largest bank headquartered in Maine.

The bank was founded in 1875.

References

Banks based in Maine
Banks established in 1875
Companies listed on the Nasdaq
Camden, Maine
Companies based in Knox County, Maine